I'm Alive may refer to:

Music

Albums
I'm Alive (Jackson Browne album) or the title song (see below), 1993
I'm Alive (Kelly Keagy album) or the title song, 2006
I'm Alive (EP), by The Hollies, or the title song (see below), 1965

Songs
"I'm Alive" (Celine Dion song), 2002
"I'm Alive" (Electric Light Orchestra song), 1980
"I'm Alive" (Elhaida Dani song), 2015
"I'm Alive" (The Hollies song), 1965
"I'm Alive" (Jackson Browne song), 1993
"I'm Alive" (Seal song), 1995
"I'm Alive" (Stretch & Vern song), 1996
"I'm Alive" (Tommy James and the Shondells song), 1969
"I'm Alive" (Willie Nelson song), 2008; covered by Kenny Chesney with Dave Matthews, 2009
"I'm Alive", by 999 from 999, 1978
"I'm Alive", by Anthrax from Worship Music, 2011
"I'm Alive", by Audio Adrenaline from Lift, 2001
"I'm Alive!", by Becca from Alive!!, 2008
"I'm Alive", by Blind Guardian from Imaginations from the Other Side, 1995
"I'm Alive", by Cirith Ungol from Frost and Fire, 1981
"I'm Alive", by Disturbed from Ten Thousand Fists, 2005
"I'm Alive", by Gotthard from Lipservice, 2005
"I'm Alive", by Heather Nova from Siren, 1998
"I'm Alive", by Helloween from Keeper of the Seven Keys: Part I, 1987
"I'm Alive", by the Hives, 2019
"I'm Alive", by Jeremy Camp from Speaking Louder Than Before, 2008
"I'm Alive", by Kiss from Asylum, 1985
"I'm Alive", by Neil Diamond from Heartlight, 1983
"I'm Alive", by Story of the Year from The Constant, 2010
"I'm Alive", by W.A.S.P. from Inside the Electric Circus, 1986
"I'm Alive", by Yoko Ono from Between My Head and the Sky, 2009
"I'm Alive", from the musical Next to Normal, 2008
"I'm Alive (Life Sounds Like)", by Michael Franti, 2013
"I'm Alive (That Was the Day My Dead Pet Returned to Save My Life)", by Alice Cooper from Zipper Catches Skin, 1982

Other media
I'm Alive (book), a 2012 memoir by Masoumeh Abad
I'm Alive, a 1980 autobiography by Cecil Williams
I'm Alive (TV series), a 2009–2011 American reality series

See also
I Am Alive (disambiguation)